Baktiya is a district in North Aceh Regency, Nanggröe Aceh Darussalam, province of Indonesia.

Baktiya has several villages, namely:
 West Alue Anou
 East Alue Anou
 Alue Bili Geulumpang
 Alue Bili Rayeuk
 Alue Buya
 Alue Dama
 Alue Geudong
 Alue Ie Puteh
 Alue Ie Tarek
 Alue Jamok
 Alue Keutapang
 Alue Rambong
 Alue Serdang
 Arongan Lise
 Babussalam
 Buket Dara Baro
 Buket Lueng Bata
 Buket Mon Sukon
 Ceumpedak
 Cinta Makmur
 Cot Ara
 Cot Kumbang
 Cot Mane
 Cot Manyang
 Cot Ulaya
 Geulumpang Bungkok
 Geulumpang Payong
 Geulumpang Samlako
 Keude Meunje IV
 West Krueng Lingka
 East Krueng Lingka
 Lhok Seutui
 Lueng Bata
 Matang Baro
 Matang Beuringen
 Matang Cut
 Matang Kareung
 Matang Kelayu
 Matang Kumbang
 Matang Lawang
 Matang Linya
 Matang Manyam
 Matang Pineung
 Matang Rawa
 West Matang Raya
 East Matang Raya
 Matang Reudeup
 Matang Ulim
 Meudang Ara
 Meunasah Bujok
 Meunasah Geudong
 Pucok Alue
 Pulo Seukee
 Rambong Dalam
 Tanjong Geulumpang
 Ujong Dama
 Keude Alue Ie Puteh
 Keude Pante Breuh

North Aceh Regency
Districts of Aceh